Julieanne Alroe is a leader in the Australian aviation industry.  She has over 40 years of experience in the aviation and one of the few women to have run a privatised airport. She planned the  $1.3 billion development of Brisbane's parallel runway, one of the largest infrastructure projects in Australia. Since 2017, she is the Chair of Infrastructure Australia.

Early life 
Alroe attended St Rita's College in Clayfield, Brisbane. She completed a Bachelor of Economics at the University of Queensland.

Career 
From 1981 Alroe commenced employment at Sydney Airport as an assistant director.

From 2009 to 2018, she was Chief Executive Officer and Managing Director of Brisbane Airport Corporation, the operator of Brisbane Airport.

She received an honorary doctorate from Griffith University in 2016 for her outstanding contribution to the aviation industry.

Board roles 
 University of Queensland Senate
 Council of Governors of the American Chamber of Commerce QLD 
 Tourism and Events Queensland (Deputy Chair)
 Infrastructure Australia (Chair)

Personal life 
Alroe is married and has a son.

References

External links 

Businesspeople from Brisbane
Aviation in Australia
Infrastructure in Australia
Brisbane Airport
Sydney Airport
Living people
Year of birth missing (living people)